Russell E. Blunt (April 24, 1908, in Andover, Massachusetts – January 7, 2004, in Durham, North Carolina) was an American high school and collegiate track and basketball coach.  

Blunt's mother moved to Massachusetts from Virginia to work as a domestic. His family lived in Massachusetts' Merrimack Valley during a time when the Black population was tiny, but he recalled the large annual church picnic outing that families from neighboring Lynn, Lowell, and Haverhill would attend each summer in Salem, Massachusetts. He attended the old Punchard High School. As a young man and collegian, Russell earned money by waiting tables in the dining hall at the famed Andover Prep school (Phillips Academy). He also played semipro baseball for the St. Clair Oil Company team, the Andover Giants, and a team called Tyer Rubber, usually as a catcher. With a baseball team called the Fairviews out of Seabrook, N.H., Blunt earned $5 and $7 a game as a catcher. Some of his teammates in those days had surnames later heavily associated with Massachusetts baseball, such as "Gagne" and "Bedrosian".

In 1927, Blunt left his home town in Massachusetts to attend St. Paul's Normal and Industrial in Lawrenceville, Virginia. When the train reached the Mason–Dixon line, he had to switch cars because of segregation. Blunt graduated from St. Augustine's College in 1936, where he began his coaching career. Blunt coached every year until his retirement, except in 1944, when he earned his master's degree from Boston University. In addition to becoming an assistant football coach at St. Paul's in 1946, Blunt also worked as a basketball official. 

He started coaching at Hillside High in Durham, North Carolina in 1955. His teams won 10 state outdoor track championships, seven indoor track championships and had one stretch where they didn't lose a dual meet for thirteen years. 

He also coached high school basketball at Hillside- his best known players were future college All-Americans and NBA players John Lucas, and Rodney Rogers. In the 1990s, USA Today published an article that stated Coach Blunt was the oldest h.s. basketball coach in America.

Dr. Blunt was inducted into the National High School Hall of Fame in 1995 and the North Carolina Sports Hall of Fame in 1996. He was a close friend of legendary University of North Carolina men's basketball Coach Dean Smith, and most other prominent local college coaches.

Duke University's Russell E. Blunt East Coast Invitational is named for the coach.

References

External links
 

1908 births
2004 deaths
American track and field coaches
Saint Paul's Tigers football coaches
St. Augustine's Falcons football coaches
College track and field coaches in the United States
High school basketball coaches in North Carolina
Boston University alumni
People from Andover, Massachusetts
Sportspeople from Essex County, Massachusetts